Paloona is a rural locality in the local government areas of Devonport and Kentish in the North-west and west region of Tasmania. The 2016 census has a population of 64 for the state suburb of Paloona.

History
Paloona was gazetted as a locality in 1965. The name is believed by some to be that of an Aboriginal man, but other meanings have been suggested. These include “waist” or “belly”.

Geography
The Forth River forms part of the western boundary. Paloona Dam and Paloona Power Station are on this section of the river, and the body of water behind the dam is called Lake Paloona.

Road infrastructure
The C144 route (Lake Paloona Road) enters from the south-west and follows the Forth River to the central west, where it exits. Route C145 (Lower Barrington Road) enters from the south-east and runs through to the north-east, where it exits.

References

Devonport, Tasmania
Localities of Kentish Council
Towns in Tasmania